Olrog's chaco mouse (Andalgalomys olrogi) is a species  of South American rodent in the family Cricetidae, endemic to Argentina. The natural habitat of the species is hot deserts. Its karyotype has 2n = 60. The species is named after Swedish-Argentine biologist Claes C. Olrog.

References

Andalgalomys
Mammals of Argentina
Endemic fauna of Argentina
Mammals described in 1978
Taxonomy articles created by Polbot